Puruhá (Puruguay, Puruwá) and Campbell (2012) is a poorly attested extinct language of the Marañón River basin in Ecuador which is difficult to classify, apart from being apparently related to Cañari, though it may have been Barbacoan. (See Cañari–Puruhá languages.)

References 

Chimuan languages
Barbacoan languages
Extinct languages of South America